Ian Harris may refer to:

 Ian Harris (British Army officer) (1910–1999), British Army general
 Ian Harris (tennis) (born 1952), American tennis player
 Ian Keith Harris (born 1936), Australian composer 
 Ian Patrick Harris (born 1971), American comedian

See also
 Ian Carr-Harris (born 1941), Canadian artist